Thymalus limbatus  is a species of beetle in family Thymalidae. It is found in the palearctic.  It is an obligate Saproxylic species associated with Betula pendula, Fagus sylvatica, Fagus sylvatica, Tilia × europaea and Picea abies mostly under bark. It feeds on fungus or dead wood.

References

External links
IUCN Red list

Trogossitidae